The Reykjanes Peninsula in southwest Iceland is the continuation of the mostly submarine Reykjanes Ridge, a part of the Mid-Atlantic Ridge, on land and reaching from Esja in the north and Hengill in the east to Reykjanestá in the west. Suðurnes (transl. Southern Peninsula) is an administrative unit covering part of Reykjanes Peninsula.

A great deal of volcanic activity was occurring in the Reykjanes Peninsula in 2020 and into 2021, after nearly 800 years of inactivity. After the eruption of the Fagradalsfjall volcano on 19 March 2021, National Geographic's experts predicted that this "may mark the start of decades of volcanic activity". The eruption was small leading to a prediction that this volcano was unlikely to threaten "any population centers".

Origin
The two most important factors for the existence of Iceland, rifting in combination with the Iceland hotspot, were responsible for the existence of Reykjanesskagi. Reykjanes Peninsula originated in a so-called rift jump 6-7 million years ago. At this time, the Snæfellsnes-Skagi rift had drifted so far to the west and away from the presumed steady place hot spot, that activity shifted eastwards in direction of this mantle plume which is now thought to be situated under the big glacier shield of Vatnajökull. Outcropping rocks have ages from 3.2 million years to the present.

Volcanism and glaciations
The topography of Reykjanes Peninsula was formed by glaciers and volcanism, basaltic lava fields covering a good part of the peninsula, in between volcanoes of subglacial as well as subaerial origin, namely tuyas, hyaloclastic ridges (tindars), shield volcanoes and crater rows. Some volcanic systems are submarine, so that there is a pronounced continuation between the volcanism of Reykjanes Ridge, a part of the Mid-Atlantic Ridge, and the Reykjanes Peninsula.

Reykjavík region
Famous in the area of Reykjavík is the Grágrýti (Gray Lava). These tertiary basalt lava layers cover much of the ground around and under Reykjavík, but their origin is unknown. It is thought that the small hills within the city, some of which were islands during periods of glaciation, could be small shield volcanoes from warm spells of the glaciations. But it is known that during the Plio-Pleistocene (from 3.2 – 1.8 million years BP) two central volcanoes were active in the Reykjavík region, Viðey volcano and Stardals volcano. Both volcanoes partially formed Esja and the smaller mountains near Reykjavík and the hills on the islands and small peninsulas like Viðey and Kjarlarnes. Volcanic and glacial sediments outcrop at some places around Reykjavík, especially in Fossvogur.

Subglacial volcanoes
Iceland was heavily ice covered during the glaciations and even completely ice covered during parts of them.  As a result, there are hundreds of subglacially formed volcanoes on Iceland. On Reykjanes Peninsula, glaciers were present until around 15,000 -12,000 years ago. Most subglacial edifices are thought to be Weichselian, with a few being older.

The subglacial volcanoes can be identified according to type as tuyas (bigger edifices whose upper parts are covered by the products of subaerial eruptions), hyaloclastite ridges (also called tindars) which means elongated subglacially formed volcanic edifices of different sizes, and cone-like subglacial mounds (very rare).  There are many hyaloclastite ridges, with most consisting of mixtures of pillow lavas, hyaloclastite and lapilli tuff. There are also elongated pillow structures, called pillow tindars. Examples on Reykjanes peninsula are Sveifluháls, Núpshlíðarháls , Undirhlíðar , Helgafell and Vífilsfell.

The tuyas are often sorted according to their form (morphology) into flat-topped tuyas, elongated tuyas, conical tuyas and complex tuyas. The prominent igneous rock is basalt, though there are also some basaltic andesite or andesite volcanoes on Reykjanes, like Húsmúli  and Stapafell  within the Hengill Volcanic System. Examples for tuyas on Reykjanes Peninsula are Keilir (conical tuya), Geitafell  (Brennisteinsfjöll), Geitahlíð and Þorbjörn are flat-topped tuyas whereas Þorðarfell  and Syllingarfell  are complex tuyas.

Postglacial shield volcanoes
The Holocene shield volcanoes represent the great bulk of magma production in this part of Iceland and form the base of many other volcanic landforms. Olivine tholeiites constitute about 60% by volume of all post-glacial lava products on the Reykjanes Peninsula." The postglacial shield volcanoes are situated at the periphery of fissure systems. They erupted after the Weichselian glaciation.

These shields are mostly circular in form, built up from pāhoehoe lavas and composed of a low-sloping lava cone surrounded by a lava apron; the older shields are made from picrite, the younger, bigger ones from olivine-tholeiite. They were probably formed in long-lived eruptions (years to decades). The best known edifices are Selvogsheiði  (height 176 m, basal width 4.8 km, summit width 0.7 km, volume 0.64 km3), Þráinskjöldur  (volume 5.2 km3), Heiðin há (volume 6 km3) and Sandfellshæð  (4.5 km3). Sandfellshæð is a very regularly constructed shield volcano and the largest in the southern part of Reykjanes Peninsula. Another important shield volcano on Reykjanes Peninsula is Leitin, formed around 5,000 years ago.

Reykjanes Volcanic Belt
Since the end of the Pleistocene glaciation (15.000 – 11.000 years ago in the region), Holocene volcanoes have done their work. The Reykjanes Volcanic Belt, one of the present day volcanic zones of Iceland, is connected to the submarine Reykjanes Ridge and consists (depending on author) of 3 to 6 or even 7 volcanic systems, arranged en echelon, i.e. more or less side by side, and in an average 40° angle to the spreading direction NE–SW over the peninsula. These volcanic systems are: Eldey Volcanic System (mostly submarine), Reykjanes Volcanic System, Svartsengi Volcanic System (often thought to be a part of Reykjanes Volcanic System), Krýsuvík Volcanic System, Brennisteinsfjöll Volcanic System, and Hengill Volcanic System (which stretches up to the north and into the West Volcanic Zone). Because they are on top of a rift segment, these volcanic systems show a tendency for fissure eruptions.

Tectonics

As is usual within rift zones, tectonics play an important role on Reykjanes Peninsula. Earthquakes are often registered. They may reach up to magnitude M6, but most of the earthquakes are small. These earthquakes often take place within the volcanic systems, but there are also many faults, fractures and fissures in the N-S direction on the peninsula. Additionally, the region is influenced by the South Iceland Seismic Zone. This southern transform zone of Iceland is between the West Volcanic Zone and the East Volcanic Zone. The larger earthquakes are felt and registered on Reykjanes Peninsula, and they can also trigger medium-sized quakes in this region, as last seen in 2008 and especially in 2000.

Current volcanism
On 20 October 2020, a 5.6 earthquake was registered on Reykjanes Peninsula at Núpshlíðarháls within the Krýsuvík system. It was followed up by over 1,000 aftershocks and is part of a series stretching over nearly one year. On 24 February 2021, a new earthquake series comprising hundreds of earthquakes and including two earthquakes over 5 were registered by the Icelandic Meteorological Office (IMO), with one registering at 5.7. The alert phase of Iceland's Civil Protection was activated, because even bigger earthquakes could not be excluded in this earthquake series, according to Kristín Jónsdóttir from IMO in a RÚV interview from the same day. The whole region has been under close scrutiny of scientists. A magnitude 5.1 earthquake was recorded on 1 March 2021. In addition, satellite pictures showed a pronounced uplift near the mountain Keilir. The magmatic dike to the southwest Keilir has a length of about 5 km.

On the evening of 19 March 2021 at around 20:45 local time, a volcanic eruption began at Fagradalsfjall mountain, some 15 km northeast of Grindavík. The eruption was small and effusive, from a 500–800 m long fissure; National Geographic predicted that this volcano was unlikely to threaten "any population centers".

See also 
 Volcanism of Iceland
 Geology of Iceland
 List of volcanoes in Iceland
 List of volcanic eruptions in Iceland
 Geological deformation of Iceland
 Global Volcanism Program

References

External links
Geotourism on Reykjanes Peninsula. Visit Reykjanes. Official website.
Geologist Páll Einarsson explains the geology of Reykjanes as well as the 2020 earthquake series. RÚV. 20 October 2020. (in Icelandic)

Reykjanes
Southern Peninsula (Iceland)
Volcanism of Iceland
Reykjanes